Port de Cabús (el. 2302 m.) is a mountain pass in the Pyrenees on the Andorran-Spanish border connecting the parish of La Massana with Alins, in Catalonia, Spain. The road is paved on the Andorran side, but not on the Spanish side.

The pass is a legal anomaly in that there are no border controls there, despite it forming the outer border of the Schengen Area, which usually features robust passport checks.

See also
 List of highest paved roads in Europe

External links
Rutes Ciclistes d'Andorra - Ruta 9, Erts-Port de Cabús
Port de Cabús - climbbybike.com

References

Andorra–Spain border crossings
Geography of Andorra
Cabús
Mountain passes of the Pyrenees
Mountain passes of Andorra